Topi Nättinen (born 1 April 1994) is a Finnish professional ice hockey player. He is currently playing for SaiPa of the Liiga.

Nättinen made his SM-liiga debut playing with JYP Jyväskylä during the 2012–13 SM-liiga season.

References

External links

1994 births
Living people
Finnish ice hockey left wingers
JYP-Akatemia players
JYP Jyväskylä players
Sportspeople from Jyväskylä
Mikkelin Jukurit players
SaiPa players
21st-century Finnish people